

Events

Pre-1600
 553 – The Second Council of Constantinople begins.
1215 – Rebel barons renounce their allegiance to King John of England — part of a chain of events leading to the signing of the Magna Carta.
1260 – Kublai Khan becomes ruler of the Mongol Empire.
1494 – On his second voyage to the New World, Christopher Columbus sights Jamaica, landing at Discovery Bay and declares Jamaica the property of the Spanish crown.

1601–1900
1609 – Daimyō (Lord) Shimazu Tadatsune of the Satsuma Domain in southern Kyūshū, Japan, completes his successful invasion of the Ryūkyū Kingdom in Okinawa.
1640 – King Charles I of England dissolves the Short Parliament.
1654 – Cromwell's Act of Grace, aimed at reconciliation with the Scots, proclaimed in Edinburgh.
1762 – Russia and Prussia sign the Treaty of St. Petersburg.
1789 – In France, the Estates-General convenes for the first time since 1614.
1809 – Mary Kies becomes the first woman awarded a U.S. patent, for a technique of weaving straw with silk and thread.
1821 – Emperor Napoleon dies in exile on the island of Saint Helena in the South Atlantic Ocean.
1821 – The first edition of The Manchester Guardian, now The Guardian, is published.
1835 – The first railway in continental Europe opens between Brussels and Mechelen.
1862 – Cinco de Mayo: Troops led by Ignacio Zaragoza halt a French invasion in the Battle of Puebla in Mexico.
1864 – American Civil War: The Battle of the Wilderness begins in Spotsylvania County.
  1865   – American Civil War: The Confederate government was declared dissolved at Washington, Georgia.
1866 – Memorial Day first celebrated in United States at Waterloo, New York.
1877 – American Indian Wars: Sitting Bull leads his band of Lakota into Canada to avoid harassment by the United States Army under Colonel Nelson Miles.
1886 – Workers marching for the Eight-hour day in Milwaukee, Wisconsin were shot at by Wisconsin National Guardsmen in what became known as the Bay View Massacre.
1891 – The Music Hall in New York City (later known as Carnegie Hall) has its grand opening and first public performance, with Tchaikovsky as the guest conductor.

1901–present
1904 – Pitching against the Philadelphia Athletics at the Huntington Avenue Grounds, Cy Young of the Boston Americans throws the first perfect game in the modern era of baseball.
1905 – The trial in the Stratton Brothers case begins in London, England; it marks the first time that fingerprint evidence is used to gain a conviction for murder.
1920 – Authorities arrest Nicola Sacco and Bartolomeo Vanzetti for alleged robbery and murder.
1930 – The 1930 Bago earthquake, the former of two major earthquakes in southern Burma kills as many as 7,000 in Yangon and Bago.
1936 – Italian troops occupy Addis Ababa, Ethiopia.
  1940   – World War II: Norwegian Campaign: Norwegian squads in Hegra Fortress and Vinjesvingen capitulate to German forces after all other Norwegian forces in southern Norway had laid down their arms.
1941 – Emperor Haile Selassie returns to Addis Ababa; the country commemorates the date as Liberation Day or Patriots' Victory Day.
1945 – World War II: The Prague uprising begins as an attempt by the Czech resistance to free the city from German occupation.
  1945   – World War II: A Fu-Go balloon bomb launched by the Japanese Army kills six people near Bly, Oregon.
  1945   – World War II: Battle of Castle Itter, one of only two battles in that war in which American and German troops fought cooperatively.
1946 – The International Military Tribunal for the Far East begins in Tokyo with twenty-eight Japanese military and government officials accused of war crimes and crimes against humanity.
1955 – The General Treaty, by which France, Britain and the United States recognize the sovereignty of West Germany, comes into effect.
1961 – Project Mercury: Alan Shepard becomes the first American to travel into outer space, on a sub-orbital flight.
1964 – The Council of Europe declares May 5 as Europe Day.
1972 – Alitalia Flight 112 crashes into Mount Longa near Palermo, Sicily, killing all 115 aboard, making it the deadliest single-aircraft disaster in Italy.
1973 – Secretariat wins the 1973 Kentucky Derby in 1:59, an as-yet unbeaten record.
1980 – Operation Nimrod: The British Special Air Service storms the Iranian embassy in London after a six-day siege.
1981 – Bobby Sands dies in the Long Kesh prison hospital after 66 days of hunger-striking, aged 27.
1985 – Ronald Reagan visits the military cemetery at Bitburg and the site of the Bergen-Belsen concentration camp, where he makes a speech.
1987 – Iran–Contra affair: Start of Congressional televised hearings in the United States of America
1991 – A riot breaks out in the Mt. Pleasant section of Washington, D.C. after police shoot a Salvadoran man.
1994 – The signing of the Bishkek Protocol between Armenia and Azerbaijan effectively freezes the Nagorno-Karabakh conflict.
  1994   – American teenager Michael P. Fay is caned in Singapore for theft and vandalism.
2006 – The government of Sudan signs an accord with the Sudan Liberation Army.
2007 – Kenya Airways Flight 507 crashes after takeoff from Douala International Airport in Douala, Cameroon, killing all 114 aboard, making it the deadliest aircraft disaster in Cameroon.
2010 – Mass protests in Greece erupt in response to austerity measures imposed by the government as a result of the Greek government-debt crisis.

Births

Pre-1600
1210 – Afonso III of Portugal (d. 1279)
1282 – Juan Manuel, Prince of Villena (d. 1348)
1310 – Preczlaw of Pogarell, Cardinal and Bishop of Wrocław (d. 1376)
1352 – Rupert of Germany, Count Palatine of the Rhine (d. 1410)
1479 – Guru Amar Das, Indian 3rd Sikh Guru (d. 1574)
1504 – Stanislaus Hosius, Polish cardinal (d. 1579)
1530 – Gabriel, comte de Montgomery, French nobleman (d. 1574)
1542 – Thomas Cecil, 1st Earl of Exeter, English soldier and politician, Lord Lieutenant of Northamptonshire (d. 1623)
1582 – John Frederick, Duke of Württemberg (d. 1628)

1601–1900
1684 – Françoise Charlotte d'Aubigné, French wife of Adrien Maurice de Noailles (d. 1739)
1747 – Leopold II, Holy Roman Emperor (d. 1792)
1749 – Jean-Frédéric Edelmann, French pianist and composer (d. 1794)
1764 – Robert Craufurd, Scottish general and politician (d. 1812)
1800 – Louis Christophe François Hachette, French publisher (d. 1864)
1813 – Søren Kierkegaard, Danish philosopher and author (d. 1855)
1818 – Karl Marx, German philosopher, sociologist, and journalist (d. 1883)
1826 – Eugénie de Montijo, French wife of Napoleon III (d. 1920)
1830 – John Batterson Stetson, American businessman, founded the John B. Stetson Company (d. 1906)
1832 – Hubert Howe Bancroft, American ethnologist and historian (d. 1918)
1833 – Ferdinand von Richthofen, German geographer and academic (d. 1905)
1834 – Viktor Hartmann, Russian painter and architect (d. 1873)
1843 – William George Beers, Canadian dentist and patriot (d. 1900)
1846 – Henryk Sienkiewicz, Polish journalist and author, Nobel Prize laureate (d. 1916)
1858 – John L. Leal, American physician (d. 1914)
1859 – Charles B. Hanford, American Shakespearean actor (d. 1926)
1864 – Nellie Bly, American journalist and author (d. 1922)
1865 – Helen Maud Merrill, American litterateur and poet (d. 1943)
1866 – Thomas B. Thrige, Danish businessman (d. 1938)
1869 – Fabián de la Rosa, Filipino painter and educator (d. 1937)
  1869   – Hans Pfitzner, German composer and conductor (d. 1949)
1874 – Thomas Bavin, New Zealand-Australian politician, 24th Premier of New South Wales (d. 1941)
1882 – Sylvia Pankhurst, English women's suffrage movement leader and socialist activist (d. 1960)
1883 – Archibald Wavell, 1st Earl Wavell, English general and politician, 43rd Governor-General of India (d. 1950)
  1883   – Anna Johnson Pell Wheeler, American mathematician (d. 1966)
1884 – Chief Bender, American baseball player and coach (d. 1954)
1885 – Kingsley Fairbridge, South African-Australian scholar and politician  (d. 1924)
1887 – Mervyn S. Bennion, American captain, Medal of Honor recipient (d. 1941)
1889 – Herbie Taylor, South African cricketer and soldier (d. 1973)
1890 – Christopher Morley, American journalist and author (d. 1957)
1892 – Dorothy Garrod, British archaeologist (d. 1968)
1898 – Elsie Eaves, American engineer (d. 1983)
  1898   – Blind Willie McTell, American Piedmont blues singer and guitar player (d. 1959)
1899 – Freeman Gosden, American actor and screenwriter (d. 1982)
1900 – Helen Redfield, American geneticist (d. 1988)

1901–present
1903 – James Beard, American chef and author (d. 1985)
1905 – Floyd Gottfredson, American author and illustrator (d. 1986)
1906 – Charles Exbrayat, French author and screenwriter (d. 1989)
1907 – Daryna Dmytrivna Polotniuk, Bukovinian (Ukrainian) journalist and author (d. 1982)
1908 – Kurt Böhme, German opera singer (d. 1989)
1909 – Miklós Radnóti, Hungarian poet and author (d. 1944)
1910 – Leo Lionni, American author and illustrator (d. 1999)
1911 – Gilles Grangier, French director and screenwriter (d. 1996)
  1911   – Andor Lilienthal, Russian-Hungarian chess player (d. 2010)
  1911   – Pritilata Waddedar, Indian educator and activist (d. 1932)
1913 – Duane Carter, American race car driver (d. 1993)
1914 – Tyrone Power, American actor (d. 1958)
1915 – Alice Faye, American actress and singer (d. 1998)
1916 – Zail Singh, Indian politician, 7th President of India (d. 1994)
1917 – Pío Leyva, Cuban singer-songwriter (d. 2006)
1918 – Egidio Galea, Maltese Roman Catholic priest (d. 2005)
1919 – Georgios Papadopoulos, Greek colonel and politician, 169th Prime Minister of Greece (d. 1999)
1921 – Arthur Leonard Schawlow, American physicist and academic, Nobel Prize laureate (d. 1999)
1922 – Irene Gut Opdyke, Polish nurse and humanitarian (d. 2003)
1923 – William C. Campbell, American golfer (d. 2013)
  1923   – James Gilbert, Scottish television producer and director (d. 2016)
  1923   – Cathleen Synge Morawetz, Canadian mathematician (d. 2017)
  1923   – Richard Wollheim, English philosopher and academic (d. 2003)
1925 – Leo Ryan, American soldier, educator, and politician (d. 1978)
1927 – Pat Carroll, American actress (d. 2022)
1929 – Ilene Woods, American actress (d. 2010)
1930 – Hans Abramson, Swedish director, producer, and screenwriter (d. 2012)
1931 – Greg, Belgian author and illustrator (d. 1999)
1932 – Stan Goldberg, American illustrator (d. 2014)
  1932   – Bob Said, American race car driver and bobsled racer (d. 2002)
1933 – Igor Kashkarov, Russian high jumper
  1933   – Collie Smith, Jamaican cricketer (d. 1959)
1934 – Henri Konan Bédié, Ivorian politician, 2nd President of Côte d'Ivoire
  1934   – Victor Garland, Australian accountant and politician, 26th Australian Minister for Veterans' Affairs
1935 – Eddie Linden, Scottish poet and magazine editor
  1935   – Bernard Pivot, French journalist, talk show host, and producer
  1935   – Robert Rehme, American film producer
1936 – Sandy Baron, American actor and comedian (d. 2001)
  1936   – Patrick Gowers, English composer and educator (d. 2014)
  1936   – Ervin Lázár, Hungarian author (d. 2006)
1937 – Beryl Burton, English racing cyclist (d. 1996) 
  1937 – Delia Derbyshire, English musician, arranger and composer (d. 2001)
1938 – Michael Murphy, American actor
  1938   – Barbara Wagner, Canadian figure skater and coach
1939 – Ray Gosling, English journalist, author, and activist (d. 2013)
1940 – Lance Henriksen, American actor
  1940   – Michael Lindsay-Hogg, American director and producer
1941 – Alexander Ragulin, Russian ice hockey player (d. 2004)
1942 – István Bujtor, Hungarian actor, director, producer, and screenwriter (d. 2009)
  1942   – Jean Corston, Baroness Corston, English lawyer and politician
  1942   – Hugh Courtenay, 18th Earl of Devon, English politician (d. 2015)
  1942   – Tammy Wynette, American singer-songwriter and guitarist (d. 1998)
1943 – Michael Palin, English actor and screenwriter
  1943   – Ignacio Ramonet, Spanish journalist and author
1944 – Bo Larsson, Swedish footballer
  1944   – John Rhys-Davies, Welsh actor and screenwriter
  1944   – Roger Rees, Welsh-American actor and director (d. 2015)
1945 – Kurt Loder, American journalist, author, and critic
  1945   – Dianne Willcocks, English sociologist and academic
  1946   – Jim Kelly, American actor, athlete, and martial artist (d. 2013)
1946 – Aydın Menderes, Turkish politician (d. 2011)
1948 – Bella van der Spiegel-Hage, Dutch cyclist
  1948   – Bill Ward, English drummer and songwriter 
1949 – Eppie Bleeker, Dutch speed skater
1950 – Rex Caldwell, American golfer
  1950   – Maggie MacNeal, Dutch singer 
1951 – Rudolf Finsterer, German rugby player and coach
  1951   – Toomas Vilosius, Estonian physician and politician, 2nd Minister of Social Affairs of Estonia
1952 – Ed Lee, American politician and attorney, 43rd Mayor of San Francisco (d. 2017)
  1952   – Jorge Llopart, Spanish race walker
  1952   – Willem Witteveen, Dutch scholar and politician (d. 2014)
1955 – Jon Butcher, American singer-songwriter, guitarist, and freelance multimedia producer
1956 – Steve Scott, American runner and coach
1957 – Richard E. Grant, Swazi-English actor, director, and screenwriter
  1957   – Peter Howitt, English actor, director, and screenwriter
1958 – Ron Arad, Israeli colonel and pilot (d. 1986)
  1958   – Robert DiPierdomenico, Australian footballer and sportscaster
  1958   – Vanessa Downing, Australian actress
  1958   – Jack Wishna, American businessman, co-founded Rockcityclub (d. 2012)
1959 – Bobby Ellsworth, American singer and bass player 
  1959   – Ian McCulloch, English singer-songwriter and guitarist 
  1959   – Steve Stevens, American guitarist and songwriter
  1959   – Brian Williams, American journalist
1960 – Doug Hawkins, Australian footballer and sportscaster
1961 – Marg Downey, Australian actress
  1961   – Hiroshi Hase, Japanese wrestler and politician
  1961   – Rob Williams, American basketball player (d. 2014)
1962 – Kaoru Wada, Japanese composer and conductor
1963 – James LaBrie, Canadian singer-songwriter 
  1963   – Simon Rimmer, English chef and author
  1963   – Scott Westerfeld, American author and composer
1964 – Jean-François Copé, French politician, French Minister of Budget
  1964   – Heike Henkel, German high jumper
  1964   – Don Payne, American screenwriter and producer (d. 2013)
  1964   – Minami Takayama, Japanese voice actress and singer
  1964   – Efrat Mishori, Israeli poet and filmmaker
1965 – Glenn Seton, Australian race car driver
1966 – Shawn Drover, Canadian drummer 
  1966   – Sergei Stanishev, Bulgarian politician, 46th Prime Minister of Bulgaria
  1966   – Josh Weinstein, American screenwriter and producer
1967 – Adam Hughes, American author and illustrator
  1967   – Alexis Sinduhije, Burundian journalist and politician
1969 – Pieter Muller, South African rugby player
1970 – Kyan Douglas, American television host and author
  1970   – Todd Newton, American game show host
1971 – Harold Miner, American basketball player
  1971   – Mike Redmond, American baseball player and manager
1972 – James Cracknell, English rower
  1972   – Žigmund Pálffy, Slovakian ice hockey player
  1972   – Mikael Renberg, Swedish ice hockey player
1975 – Meb Keflezighi, American runner
1976 – Dieter Brummer, Australian actor (d. 2021)
  1976   – Jean-François Dumoulin, Canadian race car driver
  1976   – Anastasios Pantos, Greek footballer
  1976   – Juan Pablo Sorín, Argentinian footballer and sportscaster
1978 – Morgan Pehme, American director, producer, and screenwriter
1979 – Vincent Kartheiser, American actor
1980 – Yossi Benayoun, Israeli footballer
  1980   – Hank Green, American entrepreneur, educator, and vlogger
  1980   – DerMarr Johnson, American basketball player
1981 – Craig David, English singer-songwriter, musician and producer
  1981   – Danielle Fishel, American actress
1982 – Ferrie Bodde, Dutch footballer
  1982   – Vanessa Bryant, American philanthropist and model 
  1982   – Wouter D'Haene, Belgian sprinter 
  1982   – Randall Gay, American football player
  1982   – Corey Parker, Australian rugby league footballer
1983 – James Anyon, English cricketer
  1983   – Henry Cavill, English actor
  1983   – Mabel Gay, Cuban triple jumper
  1983   – Annie Villeneuve, Canadian singer-songwriter
  1983   – Scott Ware, American football player
1984 – Johanna Hedva, Korean-American artist and genderqueer activist
  1984   – Wade MacNeil, Canadian singer-songwriter and guitarist 
  1984   – Christian Valdez, Mexican footballer 
1985 – Shoko Nakagawa, Japanese actress and singer
  1985   – Marcos Rogério Oliveira Duarte, Brazilian footballer
  1985   – Emanuele Giaccherini, Italian footballer
  1985   – Tsepo Masilela, South African footballer 
  1985   – P. J. Tucker, American basketball player
  1985   – Terrence Wheatley, American football player
1987 – Graham Dorrans, Scottish footballer
1988 – Adele, English singer-songwriter
  1988   – Mervyn Westfield, English cricketer
1989 – Chris Brown, American singer-songwriter, dancer, and actor
1991 – Xenofon Fetsis, Greek footballer
  1991   – Raúl Jiménez, Mexican footballer
1992 – Loïck Landre, French footballer
1996 – Mayar Sherif, Egyptian tennis player
1998 – Aryna Sabalenka, Belarusian tennis player
1999 – Nathan Chen, American figure skater
  1999   – Justin Kluivert, Dutch footballer
  2003 – Carlos Alcaraz, Spanish tennis player

Deaths

Pre-1600
 465 – Gerontius, Archbishop of Milan
1194 – Casimir II the Just, Polish son of Bolesław III Wrymouth (b. 1138)
1243 – Hubert de Burgh, 1st Earl of Kent, English justiciar  (b. c. 1160)
1306 – Constantine Palaiologos, Byzantine general (b. 1261)
1309 – Charles II of Naples (b. 1254)
1316 – Elizabeth of Rhuddlan, daughter of King Edward I of England (b. 1282)
1338 – Prince Tsunenaga, son of the Japanese Emperor (b. 1324)
1380 – Saint Philotheos, Coptic martyr
1432 – Francesco Bussone da Carmagnola, Italian adventurer
1525 – Frederick III, Elector of Saxony (b. 1463)
1582 – Charlotte of Bourbon, Princess consort of Orange, married to William I of Orange (b. 1547)
1586 – Henry Sidney, Irish politician, Lord Deputy of Ireland (b. 1529)

1601–1900
1671 – Edward Montagu, 2nd Earl of Manchester, English general and politician, Lord Chamberlain of the United Kingdom (b. 1602)
1672 – Samuel Cooper, English painter and linguist (b. 1609)
1700 – Angelo Italia, Italian architect (b. 1628)
1705 – Leopold I, Holy Roman Emperor (b. 1640)
1760 – Laurence Shirley, 4th Earl Ferrers, English politician (b. 1720)
1766 – Jean Astruc, French physician and scholar (b. 1684)
1808 – Pierre Jean George Cabanis, French physiologist and philosopher (b. 1757)
1821 – Napoleon, French general and emperor (b. 1769)
1827 – Frederick Augustus I of Saxony (b. 1750)
1833 – Sophia Campbell, English-Australian painter (b. 1777)
1855 – Sir Robert Inglis, 2nd Baronet, English politician (b. 1786)
1859 – Peter Gustav Lejeune Dirichlet, German mathematician and academic (b. 1805)
1860 – Jean-Charles Prince, Canadian bishop (b. 1804)
1883 – John O'Shanassy, Irish-Australian politician, 2nd Premier of Victoria (b. 1818)
1892 – August Wilhelm von Hofmann, German chemist and academic (b. 1818)
1896 – Silas Adams, American lawyer and politician (b. 1839)

1901–present
1902 – Bret Harte, American short story writer and poet (b. 1836)
1907 – Şeker Ahmed Pasha, Turkish soldier and painter (b. 1841)
1913 – Henry Moret, French painter (b. 1856)
1916 – John MacBride, Irish soldier and rebel (b. 1865)
  1916   – Maurice Raoul-Duval, French polo player (b. 1866)
1921 – Alfred Hermann Fried, Austrian journalist and publicist, Nobel Prize laureate (b. 1864)
1924 – A. Sabapathy, Sri Lankan journalist and politician (b. 1853)
1931 – Glen Kidston, English pilot and race car driver (b. 1899)
1941 – Platon of Banja Luka, Serbian Orthodox bishop (b. 1874)
1942 – Qemal Stafa, Albanian politician (b. 1920)
1947 – Ty LaForest, Canadian-American baseball player (b. 1917)
1957 – Leopold Löwenheim, German mathematician and logician (b. 1878)
1959 – Carlos Saavedra Lamas, Argentinian academic and politician, Nobel Prize laureate (b. 1878)
1962 – Ernest Tyldesley, English cricketer (b. 1889)
1965 – Nikos Gounaris, Greek tenor and composer (b. 1915)
  1965   – John Waters, American director and screenwriter (b. 1893)
1971 – Violet Jessop, Argentinean-English nurse (b. 1887)
1973 – Zekai Özger, Turkish poet and academic (b. 1948)
1977 – Ludwig Erhard, German economist and politician, Chancellor of Germany (b. 1897)
1981 – Bobby Sands, PIRA volunteer and hunger striker (b. 1954)
1983 – Horst Schumann, German physician (b. 1901)
  1983   – John Williams, English-American actor (b. 1903)
1985 – Donald Bailey, English engineer, designed the Bailey bridge (b. 1901)
1988 – Michael Shaara, American author and academic (b. 1928)
1993 – Irving Howe,  American literary and social critic (b. 1920)
1994 – Mário Quintana, Brazilian poet and translator (b. 1906)
1995 – Mikhail Botvinnik, Russian chess player and coach (b. 1911)
1999 – Vasilis Diamantopoulos, Greek actor, director, and screenwriter (b. 1920)
2000 – Gino Bartali, Italian cyclist (b. 1914)
  2000   – Bill Musselman, American basketball player and coach (b. 1940)
2001 – Morris Graves, American painter and educator (b. 1910)
  2001   – Clifton Hillegass, American publisher, created CliffsNotes (b. 1918)
2002 – Hugo Banzer, Bolivian general and politician, 62nd President of Bolivia (b. 1926)
  2002   – Paul Wilbur Klipsch, American engineer, founded Klipsch Audio Technologies (b. 1904)
  2002   – George Sidney, American director and producer (b. 1916)
  2002   – Louis C. Wyman, American lawyer and politician (b. 1917)
2003 – Sam Bockarie, Sierra Leonean commander (b. 1964)
  2003   – Walter Sisulu, South African activist and politician (b. 1912)
2006 – Naushad Ali, Indian composer and producer (b. 1919)
  2006   – Atıf Yılmaz, Turkish director, producer, and screenwriter (b. 1925)
2007 – Theodore Harold Maiman, American-Canadian physicist and engineer, created the laser (b. 1927)
2008 – Irv Robbins, Canadian-American businessman, co-founded Baskin-Robbins (b. 1917)
  2008   – Jerry Wallace, American singer and guitarist (b. 1928)
2010 – Giulietta Simionato, Italian soprano (b. 1910)
  2010   – Umaru Musa Yar'Adua, Nigerian academic and politician, 13th President of Nigeria (b. 1951)
2011 – Claude Choules, English-Australian soldier (b. 1901)
  2011   – Yosef Merimovich, Israeli footballer and manager (b. 1924)
  2011   – Dana Wynter, British actress (b. 1931)
2012 – Surendranath, Indian cricketer (b. 1937)
  2012   – Carl Johan Bernadotte, Count of Wisborg (b. 1916)
  2012   – Aatos Erkko, Finnish journalist and publisher (b. 1932)
  2012   – George Knobel, Dutch footballer, coach, and manager (b. 1922)
  2012   – Roy Padayachie, South African lawyer and politician, South African Minister of Communications (b. 1950)
2013 – Sarah Kirsch, German poet and author (b. 1935)
  2013   – Robert Ressler, American FBI agent and author (b. 1937)
2014 – Michael Otedola, Nigerian journalist and politician, 9th Governor of Lagos State (b. 1926)
2015 – Jobst Brandt, American cyclist, engineer, and author (b. 1935)
  2015   – Hans Jansen, Dutch linguist, academic, and politician (b. 1942)
2017 – Binyamin Elon, Israeli Orthodox rabbi and politician (b. 1954)
  2017   – Ely Ould Mohamed Vall, Mauritanian politician (b. 1953)

Holidays and observances
 Children's Day (Japan, South Korea)
 Christian feast day:
 Angelus of Jerusalem
 Aventinus of Tours
 Blessed Edmund Ignatius Rice
 Frederick the Wise (Lutheran Church–Missouri Synod)
 Gotthard of Hildesheim
 Hilary of Arles
 Jutta of Kulmsee
 Stanisław Kazimierczyk
 May 5 (Eastern Orthodox liturgics)
 Cinco de Mayo (Mexico, United States)
 Constitution Day (Kyrgyzstan)
 Europe Day (Council of Europe)
 Feast of al-Khadr or Saint George (Palestinian)
 Indian Arrival Day (Guyana)
 International Midwives' Day (International)
 Liberation Day (Denmark, Netherlands)
 Lusophone Culture Day (Community of Portuguese Language Countries)
 World Portuguese language day (International)
 Martyrs' Day (Albania)
 National Cartoonist Day
 Patriots' Victory Day (Ethiopia)
 Revenge of the Fifth (see Star Wars Day)
 Senior Citizens Day (Palau)
 Tango no sekku (Japan)
 Missing and Murdered Indigenous Women Awareness Day (Canada and United States)

References

External links

 BBC: On This Day
 
 Historical Events on May 5

Days of the year
May